Jos Buivenga is a Dutch typeface designer. His designs include the Museo and Calluna families and the Questa family in collaboration with Martin Majoor.

References

External links
 Personal website

Year of birth missing (living people)
Living people
Dutch graphic designers
Dutch typographers and type designers